Komoró is a village in Záhony District of Szabolcs-Szatmár-Bereg County, in the Northern Great Plain region of eastern Hungary.

Etymology
The name comes from the Slavic *komarъ (a mosquito) with the suffix -ov. 1290-1300 Komorou.

Geography

References

Populated places in Szabolcs-Szatmár-Bereg County